Oleg Gennad'yevich Belyakov (born on 2 February 1972) is a former football goalkeeper.

Career
He played for several clubs in Uzbekistan, Ukraine, Azerbaijan.

In 1991 Konchi Angren football team (now it is not in present), 1991–1993 Chirchik FC (after it renamed as Kimyogar FC Chirchik), 1994–1995 MHSK Tashkent, 1996–1999 Navbahor Namangan, 2000 FC Pakhtakor Tashkent, 2001–2002 Navbahor Namangan, 2003 FC Kryvbas Kryvyi Rih, 2004 FC Pakhtakor Tashkent, 2005 Turan Tovuz PFC, 2005–2007 Metalourg Bekabad and from 2007 he is member of PFC Kuruvchi football team.

References

External links

1972 births
Living people
Soviet footballers
Uzbekistani footballers
Uzbekistani expatriate footballers
Pakhtakor Tashkent FK players
Expatriate footballers in Azerbaijan
FC Shakhtyor Soligorsk players
Navbahor Namangan players
Expatriate footballers in Ukraine
Ukrainian Premier League players
Expatriate footballers in Belarus
FK Dinamo Samarqand players
FC Kryvbas Kryvyi Rih players
Turan-Tovuz IK players
FC Bunyodkor players
Association football goalkeepers
Uzbekistani expatriate sportspeople in Azerbaijan
Uzbekistani expatriate sportspeople in Belarus
Uzbekistani expatriate sportspeople in Ukraine
Uzbekistani people of Russian descent
Footballers at the 1998 Asian Games
Asian Games competitors for Uzbekistan
Azerbaijan Premier League players